Ben McCrow (born 1981 in Hounslow, London, England) is a British punk and death metal vocalist known for his work with Extreme Noise Terror and previously Gorerotted and The Rotted.

Discography

With Extreme Noise Terror

Studio albums 
 Extreme Noise Terror (Willowtip Records/MCR, 2015)

Singles & Splits 
 Chained and Crazed (Quagga Curious, 2015)
 Extreme Noise Terror / The Dwarves (Lowlife Records, 2016)
 Daily Holocaust (MCR Japan, 2017)

With The Rotted

Studio albums 
 Get Dead or Die Trying (Metal Blade Records, 2008)
 Anarchogram (Anarchogram Industries, 2010)
 Ad Nauseam (The Rotted album) (Candlelight Records, 2011)

Singles & Splits 
 Apathy In The UK (Hammerheart Records, 2011)
 Rotted F*cking Earth (Anarchogram Industries, 2013)
 The Rotted / Collision (Hammerheart Records, 2014)

With Gorerotted

Studio albums 
 Mutilated in Minutes (Relapse Records/IBD Records/Dead Again Records, 2001. Reissued by Hammerheart Records in 2012)
 Only Tools and Corpses (Metal Blade Records, 2003)
 A New Dawn for the Dead (Metal Blade Records, 2005)

Singles & Splits 
 Split Your Guts Vol. 1 (with Gronibard and Gruesome Stuff Relish) (Deepsend Records, 2002)

Other Appearances 
 Ted Maul – White Label (Raise The Game Records, 2006) - vocals on "The High Commissioner"
 Rex Shachath – Revocation Of The Blood Elect (Great Dane Records, 2015) - vocals on "Within The Temple Of Disgust"
 Foetal Juice – Masters Of Absurdity (Grindscene, 2016) - vocals on "Leachate King"

References

External links 
 
The Rotted at Encyclopaedia Metallum
Extreme Noise Terror at Encyclopaedia Metallum

1981 births
Living people
21st-century British singers
21st-century British male singers